The 1993 Champ Car season may refer to:
 the 1992–93 USAC Championship Car season, which was just one race, the 77th Indianapolis 500 
 the 1993 PPG Indy Car World Series, sanctioned by CART, who would later become Champ Car